Henry Krips may refer to:

Henry Krips (conductor), conductor and composer
Henry Krips (scholar), professor of cultural studies